The arrondissement of Marmande is an arrondissement of France in the Lot-et-Garonne department in the Nouvelle-Aquitaine region. It has 98 communes.

Composition

The communes of the arrondissement of Marmande, and their INSEE codes, are:
 
 Agmé (47002)
 Agnac (47003)
 Allemans-du-Dropt (47005)
 Antagnac (47010)
 Argenton (47013)
 Armillac (47014)
 Auriac-sur-Dropt (47018)
 Baleyssagues (47020)
 Beaupuy (47024)
 Birac-sur-Trec (47028)
 Bouglon (47034)
 Bourgougnague (47035)
 Brugnac (47042)
 Calonges (47046)
 Cambes (47047)
 Castelmoron-sur-Lot (47054)
 Castelnau-sur-Gupie (47056)
 Caubon-Saint-Sauveur (47059)
 Caumont-sur-Garonne (47061)
 Clairac (47065)
 Cocumont (47068)
 Coulx (47071)
 Couthures-sur-Garonne (47074)
 Duras (47086)
 Escassefort (47088)
 Esclottes (47089)
 Fauguerolles (47094)
 Fauillet (47095)
 Fourques-sur-Garonne (47101)
 Gaujac (47108)
 Gontaud-de-Nogaret (47110)
 Grateloup-Saint-Gayrand (47112)
 Grézet-Cavagnan (47114)
 Guérin (47115)
 Hautesvignes (47118)
 Jusix (47120)
 Labastide-Castel-Amouroux (47121)
 Labretonie (47122)
 Lachapelle (47126)
 Lafitte-sur-Lot (47127)
 Lagruère (47130)
 Lagupie (47131)
 Laparade (47135)
 Laperche (47136)
 Lauzun (47142)
 Lavergne (47144)
 Lévignac-de-Guyenne (47147)
 Longueville (47150)
 Loubès-Bernac (47151)
 Marcellus (47156)
 Marmande (47157)
 Le Mas-d'Agenais (47159)
 Mauvezin-sur-Gupie (47163)
 Meilhan-sur-Garonne (47165)
 Miramont-de-Guyenne (47168)
 Monteton (47187)
 Montignac-de-Lauzun (47188)
 Montignac-Toupinerie (47189)
 Montpouillan (47191)
 Moustier (47194)
 Pardaillan (47199)
 Peyrière (47204)
 Poussignac (47212)
 Puymiclan (47216)
 Puysserampion (47218)
 Romestaing (47224)
 Roumagne (47226)
 Ruffiac (47227)
 Saint-Astier (47229)
 Saint-Avit (47231)
 Saint-Barthélemy-d'Agenais (47232)
 Saint-Colomb-de-Lauzun (47235)
 Sainte-Bazeille (47233)
 Sainte-Colombe-de-Duras (47236)
 Sainte-Gemme-Martaillac (47244)
 Sainte-Marthe (47253)
 Saint-Géraud (47245)
 Saint-Jean-de-Duras (47247)
 Saint-Martin-Petit (47257)
 Saint-Pardoux-du-Breuil (47263)
 Saint-Pardoux-Isaac (47264)
 Saint-Pierre-sur-Dropt (47271)
 Saint-Sauveur-de-Meilhan (47277)
 Saint-Sernin (47278)
 Samazan (47285)
 La Sauvetat-du-Dropt (47290)
 Savignac-de-Duras (47294)
 Ségalas (47296)
 Sénestis (47298)
 Seyches (47301)
 Soumensac (47303)
 Taillebourg (47304)
 Tonneins (47310)
 Varès (47316)
 Verteuil-d'Agenais (47317)
 Villeneuve-de-Duras (47321)
 Villeton (47325)
 Virazeil (47326)

History

The arrondissement of Marmande was created in 1800.

As a result of the reorganisation of the cantons of France which came into effect in 2015, the borders of the cantons are no longer related to the borders of the arrondissements. The cantons of the arrondissement of Marmande were, as of January 2015:

 Bouglon
 Castelmoron-sur-Lot
 Duras
 Lauzun
 Marmande-Est
 Marmande-Ouest
 Le Mas-d'Agenais
 Meilhan-sur-Garonne
 Seyches
 Tonneins

References

Marmande